The year 1664 in music involved some significant events.

Events
Following the disgrace of Jacques Champion de Chambonnières, Jean-Henri d'Anglebert assumes the position of harpsichordist to Louis XIV, King of France.
Anthoni van Noordt becomes organist at the Nieuwe Kerk

Classical music
Giovanni Legrenzi – 16 Sonatas, Op.8
Heinrich Schütz – Weihnachts-Oratorium (Christmas Oratorio)
Bernardo Storace – Selva di varie compositioni
Johann Heinrich Schmelzer – Sonatae unarum fidium, seu a violino solo
Barbara Strozzi – Arie, Op. 8

Opera
Antonio Maria Abbatini – Ione
Antonio Bertali – Pazzo amor

Births
January 17 – Antonio Salvi, Italian physician, court poet and librettist (died 1724)
February 23 – Georg Dietrich Leyding, organist and composer (died 1710)
March – Georg Österreich, composer (died 1735)
March 14 – Silvio Stampiglia, librettist (died 1725)
June 28 – Nicolas Bernier, composer (died 1734)
August 6 – Johann Christoph Schmidt, composer (d. 1728)
September 9 – Johann Christoph Pez, composer (died 1716)
November 9 – Johann Speth, organist and composer (died c. 1720)
date unknown – Daniel Purcell, composer (died 1717)

Deaths
January 1 – Charles Racquet, organist (born c. 1598)
July 16 – Andreas Gryphius, librettist and playwright (born 1616)
date unknown – Juan Gutiérrez de Padilla, composer (born c.1590)

References